Curtis Albert King (born October 25, 1970) is a former pitcher in Major League Baseball. He played for the St. Louis Cardinals.

References

External links

Major League Baseball pitchers
St. Louis Cardinals players
Philadelphia Rams baseball players
Baseball players from Pennsylvania
People from Norristown, Pennsylvania
1970 births
Living people
Sportspeople from Montgomery County, Pennsylvania
Arkansas Travelers players
Louisville Redbirds players
Memphis Redbirds players
New Jersey Cardinals players
Savannah Cardinals players
St. Petersburg Cardinals players